The New Jersey Naval Museum (NJNM) was a museum located along the Hackensack River in Hackensack in Bergen County, New Jersey, United States. Its mission was dedicated to the state's Navy heritage and naval history in general. The museum land has since been sold for redevelopment, however the USS Ling remains grounded in the river, with an uncertain future. Efforts have been made since 2007 to find a new home for the Ling. In 2019, the Louisville Naval Museum began a campaign to attempt to relocate the ship to the Ohio River. In September 2020 volunteers associated with the Louisville Naval Museum began to raise concerns on social media about improper accounting of donations made to the Louisville Naval Museum. The volunteers ceased working with the Louisville Naval Museum after one of the volunteers suffered a serious injury while working aboard the USS Ling in November 2020. The injured volunteer was subsequently awarded a default judgement of $468,584 in a suit against the Louisville Naval Museum.

From 1972 until closing, the Museum had paid one dollar per year to rent its riverside site. In January 2007, the North Jersey Media Group, owner of the site, informed the museum that the site was going to be sold for redevelopment within the year and that the museum and submarine would need to be relocated.

Collections
Prior to the closing of the museum, guided tours of the Ling were available to take visitors from bow to stern, exploring equipment, quarters, and weaponry. The weaponry on the Ling includes twenty-four torpedoes and one 4" deck gun (it originally had two 5" deck guns) for handling military targets too small to warrant the expenditure of a torpedo.

Volunteers maintained Japanese Kaiten IIs, a World War II Japanese suicide torpedo; a German Seehund, a World War II German two-man coastal defense submarine; and A Vietnam War-era Patrol Boat, River (PBR), all of which the US Navy has since reclaimed, in addition to Ling and some torpedoes, missiles, and artillery shells.  The onshore museum building contained a number of different and unique items ranging from a United States Navy SEALs delivery vehicle to personal photographs and effects.

Closing

After Hurricane Sandy the gangway was destroyed, leading to the closure of the sub and museum. Furthermore, the area was selected for a development project. The Naval History and Heritage Command has taken several artifacts after they were in a state of disrepair; with the remaining artifacts being housed by Harbor Freight.

Vandalism  and Burglary

In September 2018, artifacts from the submarine were stolen, and the Ling was also flooded. Several people have been identified in connection with the burglary.

See also
  List of maritime museums in the United States
  List of museum ships
  Naval History and Heritage Command

References

External links
Photos of the USS Ling SS-297, Kaiten Suicide Submarine, German Seahund Coastal Defence Submarine, and the Vietnam era Patrol Boat Riverine

Maritime museums in New Jersey
Military and war museums in New Jersey
Naval museums in the United States
Museums in Bergen County, New Jersey
Hackensack, New Jersey
Museums established in 1972
Hackensack River
World War II museums in the United States
Vietnam War
1972 establishments in New Jersey